Elliot Mazer (September 5, 1941February 7, 2021) was an American audio engineer and record producer.  He was best known for his work with Linda Ronstadt, Neil Young, Bob Dylan, The Band, and Janis Joplin.  In addition, he worked on film and television projects for ABC and various independent studios, and taught at University of North Carolina at Asheville and Elon University.

Early life
Mazer was born in New York City on September 5, 1941.  His family moved to Teaneck, New Jersey, soon after he was born.  Bob Weinstock, who was their neighbor and owner of Prestige Records, employed Mazer at the age of 21 to sort tapes and transport them to radio stations.  He soon worked his way into the production process, ultimately creating the album Standard Coltrane in 1962 from a series of outtakes he had identified.

Career
Mazer subsequently worked for Cameo-Parkway Records.  There, he produced albums from artists such as Chubby Checker, Big Brother and the Holding Company (Cheap Thrills), and Linda Ronstadt (Silk Purse).  Mazer later moved to Nashville, Tennessee, and co-established Quadrafonic Sound Studios.  He was first introduced to Neil Young by the latter's manager, Elliot Roberts, in January 1971.  Young was visiting the city to appear on The Johnny Cash Show and attended a dinner party hosted by Mazer, where the two conversed about artists and studios.  Mazer was somewhat acquainted with Young's music only because his girlfriend at the time played After the Gold Rush incessantly.  One month later, Mazer invited Young to the studio with the aim of persuading him to record a new album there.  Young soon asked Mazer to work on Harvest, which was released the following year and began a decades-long partnership between the two.  Mazer was responsible for assembling a band of Nashville session players to record with Young.  This consisted of Tim Drummond on bass, Kenny Buttrey on drums, John Harris on piano, and Ben Keith on pedal steel guitar.  This group would later be dubbed by Young as The Stray Gators; Keith would end up recording with Young for almost four decades.  Most of Harvest was recorded at Mazer's studio, with some of it also recorded in Redwood City, California, at the Broken Arrow Ranch owned by Young.  It was in the latter setting that Mazer observed Young shout his memorable quote "More barn!" as he played the album for Graham Nash, who had overdubbed vocals on the record.  The album was ultimately honored in the Grammy Hall of Fame in 2015.

Mazer went on to produce Time Fades Away (1973), Homegrown (recorded in 1975 and released in 2020), Everybody's Rockin' (1983), and Old Ways (1985) for Young, whom he also familiarized with digital recording.  He also worked with Gordon Lightfoot on several albums, producing Back Here on Earth (1968) and the live album Sunday Concert (1969).  Another live album Mazer compiled was In Concert (1972) by Janis Joplin.  He worked on The Last Waltz (1978) by The Band, which turned out to be their farewell performance.  That album went along with the documentary film of the same name by Martin Scorsese, on which Mazer worked as audio engineer.

Aside from record producing, Mazer served as a consultant to Stanford University's Center for Computer Research in Music and Acoustics from 1976 to 1984.  He designed the world's first all-digital recording studio and co-invented "D-zap", which was a device to detect possible shocking hazards in the studio.  Mazer served as President of Artificial Intelligence Resources Inc. in the late 1980s.  Here, he developed the AirCheck Monitoring system, which was utilized to recognize songs for radio and television.  He and co-inventor Jon Birger subsequently sold the system to Radio Computing Services (RCS).  He subsequently became senior vice president of radio computing services at RCS.  Mazer also looked after the music on the Wide World of Sports program by ABC.

Later life
Mazer taught a course on record production at the University of North Carolina at Asheville in the spring of 2010.  He went on to teach music business and production at Elon University from 2011 to 2012.  One of the last albums he worked on that got released before his death was Young's Homegrown, which had been recorded back in 1975.  At that time, Mazer visited the United Kingdom after completing some of the mixing.  He played a recording of the album to the head of Chrysalis Records, who proceeded to inform Mo Ostin that he was certain that this would become "another five-million seller".  However, Young had a change of heart, and Homegrown was not released until June 2020.

Mazer died on February 7, 2021, at his home in San Francisco.  He was 79, and suffered a heart attack and was afflicted with dementia in the years leading up to his death.  Young praised Mazer on his website, calling him "[a] master in the studio".  He went on to credit him for his work on Harvest, noting how the album "is one of my most recognized recordings and it all happened because of Elliot Mazer".

Discography

References

External links
 UAudio Article
 Discography
 
 

1941 births
2021 deaths
American record producers
Elon University faculty
People from Teaneck, New Jersey
People from New York City